Charleston Town Center is an enclosed shopping mall in downtown Charleston, West Virginia. One of the largest enclosed malls in the United States to be located in a downtown shopping district, it has comprised more than 130 tenants on two levels at its peak, in addition to food court on a partial third level. Several vacancies in later years have led to conversion of large portions into office space. Popular full-service restaurants include Chili's Bar & Grill, the Chop House, Outback Steakhouse and Tidewater Grill. The only remaining anchor store is JCPenney. The mall is owned by Hull Property Group.

History
Charleston Town Center opened in 1983 in downtown Charleston as the largest downtown-based shopping mall located east of the Mississippi River. Co-developed by the Ohio-based Forest City Enterprises and Cafaro Company, the mall included four anchor stores when it opened; JCPenney, Sears, Kaufmann's and Montgomery Ward. The Montgomery Ward closed as part of its chain's bankruptcy and liquidation in 2001.  In 2002, plans were announced to renovate the mall. Under these plans, Dillard's (which, at the time, had no locations in West Virginia) would have opened in the former Montgomery Ward space. In return, the Dillard's chain asked for a $1-a-year lease as part of an incentive package, in addition to asking for $7.5 million in city loans. However, the plans for a Dillard's at the mall were later canceled, and the former Montgomery Ward remained dark, although a portion of the space was converted to a Steve & Barry's clothing store in 2002.

On February 7, 2004, McDonald's and Long John Silver's were closed in the mall. In 2005, the retail bookstore chain Books-A-Million also expressed interest in replacing the former Montgomery Ward, although this store also never came to fruition. In January 2005, Olive Garden was closed. Finally, by 2006, it was announced that BrickStreet Insurance would locate its offices in the former Montgomery Ward space, and half of the food court was closed and converted into state government offices. A year later, Kaufmann's was converted to Macy's due to the acquisition of Kaufmann's then-parent company, May Department Stores. Steve & Barry's  closed in September 2008 due to bankruptcy and the chain's liquidation; the space has since been divided between Rue21 and Rack Room Shoes.  In 2009, Disney Store closed in the mall. In 2011, television station WOWK sub-leased some unused space in the BrickStreet area to relocate its TV studio.

On December 28, 2016, Sears announced that it would be closing in April 2017 as part of a plan to close 150 stores nationwide, leaving JCPenney and Macy's as the only anchors left.

The extent of the mall's financial problems was slowly revealed in late 2017.  The nature and amount of Macy's actual rent payment was disputed by local politicians, with some stated that it actually was staying rent-free.  Finally on January 12, 2018, the Circuit Court of Kanawha County placed the mall in receivership and appointed CBRE Group as its receiver.  The mall was scheduled to be sold at auction on the Charleston courthouse steps on January 24, 2019, however the bank holding the largest note, U.S. Bancorp, was the only bidder.

On May 8, 2018, it was announced that the former Sears would be demolished for a freestanding Hilton-branded hotel.

On April 2, 2019, Macy's closed, leaving JCPenney as the only remaining department store anchor. In July 2019, BrickStreet Insurance merged with Columbus, Ohio-based Motorists Insurance Group, with the combined company rebranding as Encova Mutual Insurance Group and retaining its Charleston offices.

References

External links
Official website

Shopping malls established in 1983
Shopping malls in West Virginia
Buildings and structures in Charleston, West Virginia
Forest City Realty Trust
Tourist attractions in Kanawha County, West Virginia
1983 establishments in West Virginia